This is a list of gliders/sailplanes of the world, (this reference lists all gliders with references, where available) 
Note: Any aircraft can glide for a short time, but gliders are designed to glide for longer.

0-9

2nd Aviation Scouts
 2nd Aviation Scouts Duja – A primary type constructed by the 2nd Aviation Scouts.

20

20 Maj. 
 20. Maj Cavka
 20.Maj Ilindenka
 20.Maj Mačka
 20.Maj Vrabac A

Notes

Further reading

External links

Lists of glider aircraft